Robert Ball (born 26 October 1964) is an Australian judoka. He competed in the men's heavyweight event at the 2000 Summer Olympics.

References

External links
 

1964 births
Living people
Australian male judoka
Olympic judoka of Australia
Judoka at the 2000 Summer Olympics
Sportspeople from Newcastle, New South Wales